The Reverend Florentine Stanislaus Bechtel, S.J., (February 4, 1857 – November 22, 1933) was a French-born American Biblical scholar.

Biography
Florentine Stanislaus Bechtel was born in Haguenau, Alsace on February 4, 1857.

He was educated at the College of Providence in Amiens. He entered the Jesuits in 1874 in his native France and was sent to serve the Jesuit missions in the Midwestern United States and studied theology at the former Jesuit St. Stanislaus Seminary in Florissant, Missouri. He taught Hebrew and Sacred Scripture at St. Louis University, St. Louis, Missouri, and was a contributor to the Catholic Encyclopedia articles, including: Pillar of Cloud; Plagues of Egypt, Machabees, etc.

Bechtel died in Chicago on November 22, 1933.

References

1857 births
1933 deaths
People from Haguenau
French Jesuits
19th-century French Roman Catholic priests
19th-century American Jesuits
Saint Louis University faculty
Roman Catholic biblical scholars
Contributors to the Catholic Encyclopedia